Shady Hills is a census-designated place (CDP) in Pasco County, Florida, United States.  The population was 7,798 at the 2000 census. It is in the  Tampa-St. Petersburg-Clearwater, Florida Metropolitan Statistical Area. It is home to an active pigeon racing group.

Geography
Shady Hills is located at  (28.405633, -82.547369).

Demographics

As of the census of 2000, there were 7,798 people, 2,811 households, and 2,144 families residing in the CDP. The racial makeup of the CDP was 96.83% White, 0.56% African American, 0.62% Native American, 0.18% Asian, 0.01% Pacific Islander, 0.62% from other races, and 1.18% from two or more races. Hispanic or Latino of any race were 3.90% of the population.

There were 2,811 households, out of which 34.4% had children under the age of 18 living with them, 60.6% were married couples living together, 10.1% had a female householder with no husband present, and 23.7% were non-families. 17.6% of all households were made up of individuals, and 6.8% had someone living alone who was 65 years of age or older.  The average household size was 2.77 and the average family size was 3.10.

In the CDP, the population was spread out, with 26.8% under the age of 18, 7.1% from 18 to 24, 27.8% from 25 to 44, 26.7% from 45 to 64, and 11.6% who were 65 years of age or older.  The median age was 38 years. For every 100 females, there were 97.6 males.  For every 100 females age 18 and over, there were 96.8 males.

The median income for a household in the CDP was $34,564, and the median income for a family was $40,090. Males had a median income of $26,805 versus $23,657 for females. The per capita income for the CDP was $14,686.  About 10.8% of families and 13.6% of the population were below the poverty line, including 18.0% of those under age 18 and 16.3% of those age 65 or over.

Pigeon racing
Shady Hills is one of the premier areas for pigeon racing and hosts the Gulfcoast Homing Club, a group that races homing pigeons and hosts an annual Gulfcoast Classic competition. The event included $250,000 in prize money in 2011. Races can challenge the birds to cover 600 miles back to their home lofts. The Highlands subdivision (off Shady Hills Road in an area just south of the Hernando County line) is the center of activity for the pigeon racing participants and is home to the 200 member club and about 100 owners of homing pigeon.

References

Census-designated places in Pasco County, Florida
Census-designated places in Florida